CSG Holding Limited,, formerly China Southern Glass Holding Limited, is the largest architectural glass manufacturer in China. It involves in manufacturing and selling glass products, such as float glass, architectural glass, display glass, automotive glass, coated glass, mirrors, color filter glass, solar glass and conservation glass.

The company was established in 1984. Its A shares and B shares were listed on the Shenzhen Stock Exchange and this made it become one of the first listed companies in China. It is headquartered in Shenzhen and production bases are located in Shenzhen, Guangzhou, Dongguan, Tianjin, Chengdu, Yichang, Suzhou and Hainan Province.

References

External links
CSG Holding Limited

Glassmaking companies of China
Construction and civil engineering companies of China
Manufacturing companies based in Shenzhen
Solar energy companies of China
Government-owned companies of China
Holding companies of China
Chinese companies established in 1984
Construction and civil engineering companies established in 1984
Holding companies established in 1984
Manufacturing companies established in 1984
Chinese brands